Yeniköy is a village in the Sason District, Batman Province, Turkey. The village is populated by Kurds of the Timok tribe and had a population of 392 in 2021.

References

Villages in Sason District
Kurdish settlements in Batman Province